Lophostemoneae is a tribe in the plant family Myrtaceae from Sulawesi, Maluku, Borneo, New Guinea, and Australia.

Genera

Kjellbergiodendron
Whiteodendron
Lophostemon
Welchiodendron

References

Rosid tribes
Myrtaceae